Nokomis is a community in Minneapolis, Minnesota.  It takes its name from Lake Nokomis. It comprises eleven smaller neighborhoods.

Official neighborhoods in the Nokomis community
 Diamond Lake
 Ericsson
 Field
 Hale
 Keewaydin
 Minnehaha
 Morris Park
 Northrop
 Page
 Regina
 Wenonah

Keewaydin, Minnehaha, Morris Park, and Wenonah are also collectively referred to as Nokomis East.

References

Communities in Minneapolis